Cerro de los Batallones (Hill of the Battalions) is a hill at Torrejón de Velasco, Madrid, Spain where a number of fossil sites from the Upper Miocene (MN10) have been found.  Nine sites have been discovered with predominantly vertebrate fossils, invertebrates and plants being less represented.  The first deposits were discovered accidentally in July 1991.

Batallones-10 (B-10) is considered to contain the oldest representative of fossils.

Fossils
Nearly the entire proportion of fossils of Batallones-1 were of Carnivorans. The species of sabre-tooth cat known as Promegantereon ogygia  and Machairodus aphanistus (the first complete skull) were found at B-1, as was Simocyon a type of red panda. In regards to the saber-tooth cats, Batallones-1 represents an ideal site for recording the percentage of specimens for which breakage of the upper canines occurred. Promegantereon, Machairodus and Paramachairodus are perfect examples of this at Batallones; fossils indicate a high number of canine breaks from where the teeth hit the bones of a struggling victim, indicating these early machairodonts would use their elongated teeth to subdue prey as modern big cats do.

A new species of Hispanomys (Rodentia) was found at various sites. A new species of Micromeryx (deer) was found at B-1 and B-10.

Fauna
Below is a list of notable fossil genera from Cerro de los Batallones.

Artiodactyla
†Microstonyx
†Boselaphine antelopes
†Decennatherium rex
†Micromeryx flourensianus

Carnivora
†Ammitocyon kainos
†Amphicyon major
†Eomellivora piveteaui 
†Indarctos arctoides
†Leptofelis vallesiensis 
†Machairodus aphanistus & M. alberdiae
†Magericyon anceps & M. castellanus
†Promegantereon ogygia
†Protictitherium crassum
†Simocyon batalleri

Perissodactyla
†Aceratherium incisivum
†Hippotherium primigenium
†Hispanotherium matritense

Proboscidea
†Tetralophodon longirostris

Rodentia
†Hispanomys

See also
 List of fossil sites

Notes

References

 
 
 
 
 
 
 
 

Miocene life
Articles containing video clips
Paleontology in Spain
Miocene Europe
Landforms of the Community of Madrid